The Kwakel is a village in the municipality of Uithoorn, North Holland, the Netherlands, near the border with South Holland. Having 3880 inhabitants in 2006, it's close to Kudelstaart and Aalsmeer.

External links
Association De Kwakel

Populated places in North Holland
Uithoorn